Catanduba is a genus of South American tarantulas that was first described by F. U. Yamamoto, S. M. Lucas & Antônio Domingos Brescovit in 2012.<ref name=Yama2012>{{cite journal| last1=Yamamoto| first1=F. U.| last2=Lucas| first2=S. M.| last3=Brescovit| first3=A. D.| year=2012| title=Catanduba, a new Theraphosinae spider genus from central Brazil (Araneae, Theraphosidae)| journal=Zootaxa| pages=1–19| volume=3172| doi=10.11646/zootaxa.3172.1.1| author-link3=Antônio_Brescovit}}</ref>

Species
 it contains seven species, all found in Brazil:Catanduba araguaia Yamamoto, Lucas & Brescovit, 2012 – BrazilCatanduba canabrava Yamamoto, Lucas & Brescovit, 2012 – BrazilCatanduba flavohirta (Simon, 1889) – BrazilCatanduba peruacu Yamamoto, Lucas & Brescovit, 2012 – BrazilCatanduba piauiensis Yamamoto, Lucas & Brescovit, 2012 – BrazilCatanduba simoni (Soares & Camargo, 1948) – BrazilCatanduba tuskae'' Yamamoto, Lucas & Brescovit, 2012 (type) – Brazil

See also
 List of Theraphosidae species

References

Theraphosidae genera
Spiders of Brazil
Theraphosidae